is a subway station in the Nihonbashi neighbourhood of Chūō, Tokyo, Japan, operated by the Tokyo subway operator Tokyo Metro.

Lines
Kayabacho Station is served by the Tokyo Metro Hibiya Line and the Tokyo Metro Tozai Line.

Station layout
The Hibiya and Tozai lines cross perpendicularly at the station and so do their platforms. The Hibiya Line has two side platforms with southbound trains using track 1 and northbound trains using track 2. In contrast, the Tozai Line has a single island platform with tracks on either side; platform 3 serves eastbound trains whilst platform 4 serves westbound trains.

Platforms

History
The station opened on February 28, 1963, as part of the Hibiya line, which then ran between Higashi-Ginza and Kita-Koshigaya (on the Tōbu Isesaki Line). The Tōzai Line platforms opened on September 14, 1967.

The station facilities were inherited by Tokyo Metro after the privatization of the Teito Rapid Transit Authority (TRTA) in 2004.

Surrounding area
Kayabachō Station is located at an intersection of two major streets in southern Nihonbashi (specifically Nihonbashi-Kayabachō), a neighbourhood in Chūō Ward renowned for its financial history and commercial development. The Tokyo Stock Exchange is only a few blocks west in Nihonbashi-Kabutochō.
Suitengūmae Station (approximately 10 minutes' walk)

See also
 List of railway stations in Japan

References

External links

 Kayabachō Station information (Tokyo Metro) 

Railway stations in Japan opened in 1963
Stations of Tokyo Metro
Tokyo Metro Tozai Line
Railway stations in Tokyo
Nihonbashi, Tokyo